Eryopoidea are a taxon of late Carboniferous and Permian temnospondyli amphibians, known from North America and Europe.  Carroll includes no fewer than ten families, but Yates and Warren replace this with a cladistic approach and include three families, the Eryopidae, Parioxyidae and Zatrachydidae.  They define the Eryopoidea as all Euskelia in which the choana are relatively rounded and the iliac blade vertical.  A similar definition but without the Euskelia is provided by Laurin and Steyer.

References

External links
Palaeos
Eryopoidea – Mikko's Phylogeny Archive

Carboniferous temnospondyls
Permian temnospondyls
Pennsylvanian first appearances
Permian extinctions
Taxa named by Edward Drinker Cope